Ivan Piccoli (born 3 April 1981) is an Italian professional footballer who plays for Santarcangelo.

In January 2008 he was loaned to Ancona. He was signed outright in June.

After Ancona was expelled from professional league, he joined Fano on 6 December 2010.

References

External links
 AIC profile (data by football.it) 

1981 births
Living people
Italian footballers
Serie B players
A.C. Cesena players
A.C. Ancona players

Association football midfielders